The 2016–17 Women's FIH Hockey World League Final took place between 17 and 26 November 2017 in Auckland, New Zealand. A total of eight teams competed for the title.

The Netherlands won the tournament for a record second time after defeating host nation New Zealand 3–0 in the final match. South Korea won the third place match by defeating England 1–0.

Qualification
The host nation qualified automatically in addition to 7 teams qualified from the Semifinals. The following eight teams, shown with final pre-tournament rankings, competed in this round of the tournament.

Results
All times are local (UTC+13).

First round

Pool A

Pool B

Second round

Quarterfinals

Fifth to eighth place classification
The losing quarterfinalists are ranked according to their first round results to determine the fixtures for the fifth to eighth place classification matches.

Seventh place game

Fifth place game

First to fourth place classification

Semifinals

Third place game

Final

Statistics

Final ranking

Awards

Goalscorers
5 goals
 Delfina Merino
 Maartje Krekelaar

4 goals
 Nike Lorenz

3 goals
 Sophie Bray
 Marie Mävers
 Kelly Jonker

2 goals

 María José Granatto
 Song Xiaoming
 Laurien Leurink
 Caia van Maasakker
 Frédérique Matla
 Cho Hye-jin
 Park Seung-a
 Kathleen Sharkey
 Loren Shealy
 Taylor West
 Jill Witmer

1 goal

 Noel Barrionuevo
 Martina Cavallero
 Julia Gomes Fantasia
 Agustina Habif
 María Paula Ortiz
 Eugenia Trinchinetti
 Gu Bingfeng
 Wang Shumin
 Zhong Mengling
 Alex Danson
 Sarah Haycroft
 Hannah Martin
 Teresa Martin-Pelegrina
 Charlotte Stapenhorst
 Margot van Geffen
 Marloes Keetels
 Maria Verschoor
 Lidewij Welten
 Erin Goad
 Ella Gunson
 Olivia Merry
 Stacey Michelsen
 Brooke Neal
 Jang Hee-sun
 Jang Soo-ji
 Kim Jong-eun
 Melissa González
 Erin Matson
 Erin McCrudden

References

External links
Official website

!
November 2017 sports events in New Zealand
2016-17 Women's FIH Hockey World League Final
Sports competitions in Auckland
2017 in New Zealand women's sport